Acacia anomala, commonly known as grass wattle is a shrub belonging to the genus Acacia. It is native to a small area along the west coast of Western Australia, and is listed as a vulnerable species under the Western Australian Wildlife Conservation Act and the Commonwealth Environmental Protection Act.

Description
It has a multi-stemmed base with narrowly winged upper stems. It produces yellow flowers between August and September. The flower spikes are usually .

Taxonomy
The species was first formally described by Arthur Bertram Court in 1978 as part of the work Three new species of Acacia (Mimosaceae) from Western Australia published in the journal Nuytsia. It was briefly reclassified by Leslie Pedley in 2003 as Racosperma anomalum, then back to the original name in 2006, with the dispute being finally resolved in 2011. (See Acacia.)

The type specimen was collected by Charles Austin Gardner and H.H.Kretchmar in 1961 between Muchea and Chittering. It is very similar in appearance to Acacia applanata.

Distribution
The species has a very small range, confined to an area between Chittering, Swan and Kalamunda where it grows on the slopes of the Darling Range in lateritic soils. It is mostly found as part of Eucalyptus woodland communities.

See also
List of Acacia species

References

External links
Google image search: Acacia anomala

anomala
Acacias of Western Australia
Plants described in 1978
Fabales of Australia
Taxa named by Charles Gardner